Chinese irredentism refers to irredentist claims to territories of the former Chinese Empire made by the Republic of China (ROC) and subsequently the People's Republic of China (PRC).

History

In Chinese political theory, relations between foreign states were governed by the tributary system. Since the Emperor of China held the Mandate of Heaven, his rule was universal and extended to all under Heaven. Sometimes neighboring states were actual protectorates or vassal states over which Chinese dynasties exerted large amount of influence, while in other cases foreign states merely acknowledged China's nominal suzerainty in order to gain access to Chinese trade, which took place through the tributary system.

Qin dynasty 
Ying Zheng of the state of Qin first unified the Chinese states to form the Chinese Empire in 221 BC. Under the Qin dynasty, China expanded southward and northward, clashing with ancient Baiyue, Dongyi and Xiongnu peoples.

Han dynasty 
The Han dynasty expanded southward and established control over Vietnam. It also ruled over northern Korea and the Tarim Basin.

Sui dynasty 
The Sui dynasty attempted to expand into the Korean Peninsula but was stopped after disastrous campaigns that contributed to the collapse of the dynasty. The Sui dynasty also reincorporated Vietnam and attacked Champa.

Tang dynasty 
The Tang dynasty expanded greatly into Central Asia as far west as the Caspian Sea. The Tang dynasty aided Silla in defeating Goguryeo and Baekje, and the Tang subsequently established the Protectorate General to Pacify the East, the Ungjin Commandery, and the Gyerim Territory Area Command on the Korean Peninsula. In the north, the Tang dynasty extended its control into the Mongolian Plateau and southern Siberia with the Protectorate General to Pacify the North.

Song dynasty 
The Song dynasty, in securing maritime trade routes that ran from Southeast Asia into the Indian Ocean, had established fortified trade bases in the Philippines. It also sought to reclaim Vietnam and various northern heartland from the rivalling Jin dynasty, but the campaigns were unsuccessful.

Yuan dynasty 
The Yuan dynasty incorporated northern Burma and Tibet into China. It also established the Zhengdong Province on the Korean Peninsula and ruled the area through the vassal kings of the Goryeo dynasty. However, its failed invasion of Vietnam and Japan, among others, led to the end of Yuan expansionist desires.

Ming dynasty 
During the Ming dynasty, Chinese rule over Vietnam was re-established, but it lasted only 20 years and ended when Ming forces were defeated in the Battle of Tốt Động – Chúc Động. After the failure, China stopped adhering to expansionism until the rise of the Qing dynasty.

Qing dynasty 
The Qing dynasty inaugurated a new age in Chinese expansionism. The Qing invaded the Joseon dynasty and incorporated it into its tributary system. Outer Mongolia, Tibet and Xinjiang were incorporated into China following decades of territorial expansion. The Qing dynasty also extended its control into Central Asia and annexed Taiwan, which was previously controlled by the Ming loyalist Kingdom of Tungning. However, the Qing dynasty had little success in its campaigns against Burma, Vietnam, and Nepal. Qing expansionism stopped following its defeat in the First Opium War which marked the start of the "century of humiliation".

Modern Chinese irredentism

Taiwan 

The Republic of China (ROC) was established in mainland China in 1912 following the conclusion of the Xinhai Revolution which led to the collapse of the Qing dynasty. The Chinese Civil War that broke out in 1927 was fought between the Kuomintang-led ROC government and the Chinese Communist Party (CCP).

Since the end of the Chinese Civil War in 1949, the de facto territories of the ROC are limited to the Taiwan Area which includes the island of Taiwan (ceded to the Empire of Japan in 1895 by the Qing dynasty of China; handover to the Republic of China in 1945) and several other islands. Meanwhile, the People's Republic of China (PRC), established in 1949 by the CCP, controls mainland China, Hong Kong and Macau. Officially, both the ROC and the PRC claim de jure sovereignty over all of China (including Taiwan), and regard the other government as being in rebellion.

Until 1971, the ROC was the representative of "China" at the United Nations (UN) and was a permanent member of the UN Security Council with veto power. In 1971, the PRC replaced the ROC as the representative of "China" at the UN.

Skepticism from Taiwanese toward the PRC has intensified as a result of growing Chinese nationalist threat to attack the island if an independent Taiwanese state was to be created. Since the election of the independence-leaning Tsai Ing-wen, the PRC has conducted numerous military drills preparing for possible armed conflict with the ROC.

South China Sea 

Territorial claims of the People's Republic of China (PRC) and the Republic of China (ROC) in the South China Sea overlap with the claims of Vietnam, the Philippines, Brunei and Malaysia. Further escalating the conflict, the PRC announced the establishment of Sansha City, which included the entirety of the Paracel Islands and Spratly Islands.

East China Sea 

The PRC frequently deploy ships since the 2010s to contest Japanese claim over the Senkaku Islands.

India 

China maintains territorial disputes with India with regard to Aksai Chin and the McMahon Line. The Chinese government claims the Aksai Chin as part of Xinjiang and Tibet, while the government of India claims the territory as part of Ladakh. The McMahon Line, negotiated at the 1914 Simla Convention, demarcated the border between India and Tibet, a border which the Chinese government has rejected as being legally binding. Tensions between the two countries have erupted into war several times, with the largest war being the Sino-Indian War of 1962 in which China was victorious and gained control over Aksai Chin, and the 1967 conflict in which India won. The 2020 border clashes, which caused casualties for both sides, further strained Sino–Indian relations.

China has reinforced its claim by publishing maps depicting South Tibet as Chinese territory. China also pushed forward to reinforce its claim over Sikkim and Ladakh, and consolidating border control in Aksai Chin.

Bhutan 

On June 29, 2017, Bhutan protested to China against the construction of a road in the disputed territory of Doklam. On the same day, the Bhutanese border was put on high alert and border security was tightened as a result of the growing tensions. In 2020, China claimed that the Sakteng Wildlife Sanctuary was also part of the territory in dispute.

See also

 Colonialism
 Chinese expansionism
 Chinese nationalism
 Han chauvinism
 Anti-Chinese sentiment
 Sinicization
 Sinocentrism
 Tributary system of China
 Pax Sinica
 Golden ages of China
 Territorial disputes of the People's Republic of China

Notes

References

China
Chinese nationalism
Politics of China